The  is a Bo-Bo wheel arrangement diesel-electric locomotive type on order by Japan Freight Railway (JR Freight) for use on freight and shunting duties in Japan. A prototype locomotive was delivered in late June 2017 for testing and evaluation in the Tokyo area.

Overview
The Class DD200 was developed to replace ageing Class DE10 and Class DE11 diesel-hydraulic locomotives used on freight services over non-electrified lines, and also for shunting duties at freight terminals.

History
Details of the Class DD200 were officially announced by JR Freight on 15 June 2017. A prototype locomotive, DD200-901, was delivered to JR Freight's Shin-Tsurumi Depot from the Kawasaki Heavy Industries factory in Kobe in late June 2017. This is scheduled to undergo testing and evaluation in shunting operations at Tokyo Freight Terminal and in main line operations in the Tokyo area to obtain data to be used in the design of the full-production locomotives.

Classification

The DD200 classification for this locomotive type is explained below.
 D: Diesel locomotive
 D: Four driving axles
 200: Diesel-electric locomotive with AC motors

References

External links

 JR Freight press release 

Diesel-electric locomotives of Japan
DD200
Bo-Bo locomotives
1067 mm gauge locomotives of Japan
Railway locomotives introduced in 2017
Kawasaki diesel locomotives